This list includes past and present footballers who have played/play for AFC Ajax (women).

List of players

See also
:Category:AFC Ajax (women) players
AFC Ajax Vrouwen#Current squad

References
 

Players
 
Ajax
Association football player non-biographical articles